Justice Walsh may refer to:

Joseph T. Walsh (1930–2014), associate justice of the Delaware Supreme Court
Nicholas Walsh (judge) (1542–1615), chief justice of the Irish Common Pleas
William C. Walsh (1890–1975), associate justice of the Maryland Court of Appeals

See also
Judge Walsh (disambiguation)